Conflation is the merging of two or more sets of information, texts, ideas or opinions into one, often in error. Conflation is defined as fusing or blending, but is often misunderstood as ‘being equal to’ - treating two similar but disparate concepts as the same. Merriam Webster suggest this happened relatively recently, entering their dictionary in 1973.   

In logic, it is the practice of treating two distinct concepts as one, which produces errors or misunderstandings as a fusion of distinct subjects tends to obscure analysis of relationships which are emphasized by contrasts. However, if the distinctions between the two concepts may appear to be superficial, intentional conflation can be desirable for the sake of conciseness and recall.

Communication and reasoning
The result of conflating concepts may give rise to fallacies and ambiguity, including the fallacy of four terms in a categorical syllogism. For example, the word "bat" has at least two distinct meanings: a flying animal, and a piece of sporting equipment (such as a baseball bat or cricket bat). If these meanings are not distinguished, the result may be the following categorical syllogism, which may be seen as a joke (pun):

All bats are animals.
Some wooden objects are bats.
Therefore, some wooden objects are animals.

Logical conflation
Using words with different meanings can help clarify, or can cause real confusion. English words with multiple (verb) meanings can be illustrated by instances in which a motion is merged with or a causation with manner, e.g. the bride floated towards her future. In this example, the bride may be married on a boat, airplane, or hot-air balloon, etc. She could be walking the aisle towards matrimony. The verb "float" has multiple meanings, and both verb meanings in the example may be proper uses of a bride "floating" toward a future. The "manner" of the scene, described by further context, would explain the true meaning of the sentence.

In an alternate illustrative example, respect is used both in the sense of recognizing a right and having high regard for someone or something. We can respect someone's right to an opinion without holding this idea in high regard. But conflation of these two different concepts leads to the notion that all ideological ideas should be treated with respect, rather than just the right to hold these ideas. Conflation in logical terms is very similar to equivocation.

Deliberate idiom conflation is the amalgamation of two different expressions. In most cases, the combination results in a new expression that makes little sense literally, but clearly expresses an idea because it references well-known idioms.

Types
All conflations fit into one of two major categories: "congruent" conflations and "incongruent" conflations.

Congruent conflations
Congruent conflations are the more ideal examples of the concept. These occur when the two root expressions reflect similar thoughts. For example, "look who's calling the kettle black" can be formed using the root expressions "look who's talking" and "the pot calling the kettle black". These root expressions really mean the same thing: they are both a friendly way to point out hypocritical behavior. Of course, "look who's calling the kettle black" does not directly imply anything, yet the implication is understood because the conflation clearly refers to two known idioms.

Incongruent conflations
Incongruent conflation occurs when the root expressions do not mean the same thing, but share a common word or theme. For example, "a bull in a candy store" can be formed from the root expressions "a bull in a China shop" and "a kid in a candy store". The latter expression paints a picture of someone ("a kid") who is extraordinarily happy and excited, whereas the former brings to mind the image of a person ("a bull") who is extremely clumsy, indelicate, not suited to a certain environment, prone to act recklessly, or easily provoked. The conflation expresses both of these ideas at the same time. Without context, the speaker's intention is not entirely clear.

Humorous conflations
Idiom conflation has been used as a source of humor in certain situations. For example, the Mexican character El Chapulín Colorado once said
"Mas vale pájaro en mano que Dios lo ayudará...no, no...Dios ayuda al que vuela como pájaro...no... bueno, la idea es esa."
meaning
"A bird in the hand will get the worm...no, wait...The early bird is worth two in the bush...no... well, that's the idea."
by combining two popular expressions:
"Más vale pájaro en mano que cientos volando" ("A bird in the hand is worth two in the bush.")
"Al que madruga Dios lo ayuda" ("The early bird gets the worm.")
This was typical of the character, and he did it with several other expressions over the course of his comedy routine.

In popular culture, identities are sometimes intentionally conflated. In the early 2000s, the popular American actors Ben Affleck and Jennifer Lopez were dating, and the tabloid press referred to them playfully as a third entity, Bennifer.

Taxonomic conflation
In taxonomies, a conflative term is always a polyseme.

See also
 Amalgamation (names)
 Confounding variable in regression analysis
 Essentialism
 Portmanteau
 Skunked term
 Stemming algorithm
 Syncretism

Notes

References
 Alexiadou, Artemus. (2002).  Theoretical Approaches to Universals. Amsterdam: John Benjamins Publishing Company. ;  OCLC 49386229
 Haught, John F. (1995).  Science and Religion: From Conflict to Conversation. New York: Paulist Press. ;  OCLC 32779780
 Malone, Joseph L. (1988).  The Science of Linguistics in the Art of Translation: Some Tools from Linguistics for the Analysis and Practice of Translation. Albany, New York: State University of New York Press. ; OCLC 15856738

External links

 Conflations

Logic
Fallacies